Michael Soutzos (Constantinople, 1778 or 1784 – Athens, 12 June 1864), was a member of the Soutzos family of Phanariotes, he was the grandson of Michael Drakos Soutzos; he was in turn a Prince of Moldavia, between 12 June 1819 and 29 March 1821. He was initiated into Filiki Eteria, he supported the Greek revolution in Moldavia and Wallachia and after the creation of the Greek state, he served as ambassador of the country abroad.

Biography

He was born in Istanbul in 1778 or according to other sources in 1784. His parents were the Phanariot Grigorios Soutzos and Sevasti Tedeskou. During his adolescence he lived in the court of his grandfather Michael Drakos Soutzos, who was ruler of Wallachia and later, he served as secretary to the Grand Dragoman of the Sublime Porte, Ioannis Karatzas, whose daughter, Roxanne, he married in 1812. In the same year, thanks to his knowledge of languages and the favor of his father in law, he was appointed to the position of the Grand Dragoman.

In 1819 he was placed by the sultan as ruler of Moldavia, position he held until 1821. He also had a position in the council of Sultan Mahmud II and he was one of the consultants that in 1820 supported the suppression of the rebellion of Ali Pasha. In November 1820 he was initiated into the Filiki Eteria by Iakovos Rizos Neroulos.

In January 1821, he finalized his collaboration with Alexander Ypsilantis and with the invasion of Ypsilantis in Moldova on 22 February, Michael Soutzos-Vodas raised the guard in command of the rebels and paid substantial amounts of money for the needs of the army. When after a short time, the movement in Moldova-Wallachia began to ebb, Soutzos forced under the pressure from the boyars, who declared him as downfallen by the time he had help the rebels and had repudiated Ottoman domination, to leave his position in Iași. At first, he moved at Skouleni and then (31 March 1821) in Chișinău of Russian Empire. During the same period the Ecumenical Patriarchate of Constantinople excommunicated him and Ypsilantis.

Thereafter, he tried to escape to Switzerland through Austrian Empire but there he was arrested and was imprisoned for almost four years. After his release, he fled first to Italy and then to Switzerland. There, he was hosted in Geneva by the Swiss Philhellene Jean-Gabriel Eynard. During his stay in Europe, he arranged for the collection and distribution of money in favor of the Greek War of Independence and he was in contact with the "Committee of Zakynthos" of Dionysios Romas. Before the undertaking of the governance of Greece by Ioannis Kapodistrias, Soutzos was one of the possible candidates to occupy this position.

During Kapodistrias governance, he was appointed as representative of Greece to France, following the recommendation of Eynard. Later, he was appointed by Otto of Greece as Greek ambassador in France, Russian Empire, Sweden and Denmark. In 1839 he moved permanently in Athens and he served until 1840 as Member of the Council of the State while he was one of the first settlers of the old Athenian neighborhood Vathi or Vatheia.

He died on 12 June 1864 in Athens. From his marriage to Roxanne (Loxandra) Karatza, he had three children, Gregorios Soutzos (famous painter of the time), Ioannis Soutzos and Maria Soutzou.

References

1864 deaths
Year of birth uncertain
Politicians from Istanbul
Rulers of Moldavia
Dragomans of the Porte
Michael
Members of the Filiki Eteria
Moldavian people of the Greek War of Independence
People excommunicated by the Greek Orthodox Church
Constantinopolitan Greeks
Diplomats from Istanbul